This is a list of some physical properties of common glasses. Unless otherwise stated, the technical glass compositions and many experimentally determined properties are taken from one large study. Unless stated otherwise, the properties of fused silica (quartz glass) and germania glass are derived from the SciGlass glass database by forming the arithmetic mean of all the experimental values from different authors (in general more than 10 independent sources for quartz glass and Tg of germanium oxide glass).

The list is not exhaustive.

References

 
Materials science